Senator Bristol may refer to:

Nathan Bristol (1805–1874), New York State Senate
Wheeler H. Bristol (1818–1904), Florida State Senate
William Bristol (1779–1836), Connecticut State Senate